City Duma may refer to:

 City Duma of Nizhny Novgorod, the municipal legislative body in Nizhny Novgorod.
 Saint Petersburg City Duma, the municipal legislative body in Saint Petersburg.
 Moscow City Duma, the municipal legislative body in Moscow.